Trichaetoides chloroleuca is a moth in the family Erebidae. It was described by Francis Walker in 1859. It is found on Borneo, Sumatra, Peninsular Malaysia and in Singapore. It is mostly found in lowland areas.

References

Moths described in 1859
Syntomini